Jennifer Rosanne Tinmouth (born 8 March 1978) is an English motorcycle racer. She is the current female Isle of Man TT lap record holder, breaking the record during her first ever TT in 2009 and gaining a Guinness World Record for this achievement. She then re-broke her own lap record during her second TT in 2010, with an average lap speed of 119.945 mph, gaining another Guinness World Record.

Tinmouth is also the first and only female competing in the British Superbike Championship, for which she received yet another Guinness World Record.

Achievements

Tinmouth has achieved many firsts for women in the sport. She was the first female to enter and qualify to race in the British 125GP championship, the British Supersport and Supersport Cup Championships and the British Championship.

She is the first female to lead and score points in a British Championship Race, the first to stand on the podium and the first to win a British Championship Race with a win in the Supersport Cup at Silverstone in 2010. She completed the 2010 championship with the most points and in previous years would have won the championship outright but with the new 2010 rules she was placed 3rd overall, the highest championship finishing place for a female competitor.

Tinmouth is the first British female to race in World Supersport and the first to race a full-blown superbike when she was invited to race for Rizla Suzuki in 2007 as a team mate to current MotoGP rider Cal Crutchlow.

Tinmouth also won the first ever UK Electric Bike Racing (TTXgp) Championship in 2010 as well as finishing 3rd in the World Electric bike Racing Championship in the same year aboard her Agni Z2 and finished fourth in the TT Zero race during the 2010 Isle of Man TT.

In 2011, she began racing a superbike full-time, entering the British Superbike Championship and racing for the Splitlath Motorsport Team. Tinmouth began her own British Superbike Team – Two Wheel Racing – in 2011, running under the name of her main sponsors Hardinge and Sorrymate.com, making her the first ever female British Superbike Team owner.

Tinmouth has achieved many accolades as well as her Guinness World Records. In 2012, she received The Women's International Film and Television Showcase International Visionary Awards 'IT Girl' award presented in Los Angeles for her commitment and dedication to her sport, citing her as an inspiration to women across the spectrum of all ages around the world. She also received the most Meritorious Performance by a Solo Newcomer Award at the TT in 2009 and the Susan Jenness Trophy in both 2009 and 2010 for the Most Meritorious Performance by a female competitor at the TT and has received two 'Your Champions' Sporting awards.

She ran her own team, Two Wheel Racing, with the support of Manx Glass & Glazing Ltd, in the British Superbike Championship for 2013.

Tinmouth previously campaigned in some Thundersport GB rounds during 2013.

For the 2015 season, Tinmouth competed in the British Superbike Championship as part of the Honda Racing UK, with team-mates Jason O'Halloran and Dan Linfoot.

Career statistics
Stats correct as of 9 July 2012

British Superbike Championship

 * Season still in progress

References

External links
Personal website
Team website
Two Wheel Workshop

Living people
Sportspeople from Chester
English sportswomen
English motorcycle racers
British Supersport Championship riders
British Superbike Championship riders
Isle of Man TT riders
1978 births
Supersport World Championship riders
Female motorcycle racers